Pasjača (Serbian Cyrillic: Пасјача) is a mountain in southern Serbia, near the town of Žitorađa. Its highest peak has an elevation of 971 meters above sea level.

References

Mountains of Serbia
Rhodope mountain range